The Sierra Pelona, also known as the Sierra Pelona Ridge or the Sierra Pelona Mountains, is a mountain ridge in the Transverse Ranges in Southern California. Located in northwest Los Angeles County, the ridge is bordered on the north by the San Andreas fault and lies within and is surrounded by the Angeles National Forest.

Geography
The Sierra Pelona Mountains lie northwest of the San Gabriel Mountains, which are divided by the wide Soledad Canyon formation. The mountains are flanked to the south by the Santa Clarita Valley and separated from the Antelope Valley and the Mojave Desert to the north by the San Andreas Fault. Toward the southeast lie Vasquez Rocks, thrust up by the fault. The Tejon Pass separates the Sierra Pelonas, the San Emigdios the Tehachapis, and the Topatopa Mountains near Gorman and Lebec.

Within the Sierra Pelonas lie the rural areas of Neenach, Three Points, Lake Hughes, Elizabeth Lake, Acton, Agua Dulce and Green Valley. The cities of Santa Clarita, Palmdale, and Lancaster are located at the base of the mountains.

Climate
The climate of the mountains is a Mediterranean climate. Summers are mostly dry except for occasional thunderstorms, and winters comparatively cold and wet. Snowfall is infrequent due to the relatively low elevations of mountains within this ridge, with only the few tallest peaks regularly receiving snowfall during the winter.

Ecology
Mainly the ridge falls under the California montane chaparral and woodlands ecoregion, excepting the northeastern flank's gradual slope into the Antelope Valley near Palmdale where the ecology transitions to that of the Mojave Desert. The mountains are primarily covered in short grasses, scrub oak trees, yucca, and other chaparral shrubs. The ridge is prone to wildfires in the summer and fall, especially when the Santa Ana winds blow in from the Antelope Valley.

Hydrology

Three major tributaries of the Santa Clara River and numerous minor watercourses and washes drain the ridge: Castaic Creek, San Francisquito Creek, and Bouquet Creek. 

Three sag ponds nestle within the narrow valley that divides the mountains from the Antelope Valley: Hughes Lake, Munz Lakes, and Elizabeth Lake.

Human history

Native American habitation

The Native population of California in the Sierra Pelona and Santa Susana Mountains included the Tataviam and Serrano people. They traded with the Tongva and Chumash to the south and west, until the Spanish colonization of the Americas relocated them from their homelands.

18th and 19th centuries
The San Francisquito Canyon, which runs north-south through the mountains, served as a major wagon route between the Antelope and San Fernando Valleys. This corridor summited at San Francisquito Pass and was part of the El Camino Viejo - an alternate land route to the El Camino Real for reaching northern Spanish and Mexican colonial Alta California - as well as the Butterfield Overland Mail route.

20th century
The Ridge Route, a landmark two-lane highway that connected Los Angeles to the rest of California, was built along the western flank of the ridge and was completed in 1915. It was later bypassed by the Ridge Route Alternate (US 99) in 1930, itself superseded by Interstate 5 completed in 1971.

The rapid development of Southern California throughout the 20th century saw construction of the Los Angeles Aqueduct and five separate reservoirs to supply water to the region: Castaic Lake, Bouquet Reservoir, Drinkwater Reservoir, and Dry Canyon Reservoir and the St. Francis Reservoir, both now drained and destroyed.

Highest peaks

 Burnt Peak: 5,788 ft (1,764 m)
 Liebre Mountain: 5,760+ ft (1,756+ m)
 Sawmill Mountain: 5,514 ft (1,681 m)
 Mount McDill: 5,177 ft (1,578 m)
 Jupiter Mountain: 4,498 ft (1,371 m)
 Redrock Mountain (benchmark): 3,991 ft (1,216 m)

Adjacent landforms
 Tehachapi Mountains - on the north
 San Emigdio Mountains - on the northwest
 Topatopa Mountains - on the west
 Santa Susana Mountains - to the southwest
 San Gabriel Mountains - to the east
 Santa Clarita Valley - to the south
 Soledad Canyon - to the southeast
 Antelope Valley (part of the Mojave Desert) - on the east-northeast

References

See also

 Centennial, California, a proposed master-planned community in the area

 
Transverse Ranges
Mountains of the Mojave Desert
Mountains of Los Angeles County, California
Angeles National Forest